Katama Airpark  is a public airport in the Katama section of Edgartown, Massachusetts, in Dukes County on the island of Martha's Vineyard. The airport, owned by the Town of Edgartown, has three runways, averages 22 takeoffs and landings per day, and has approximately four aircraft based on its field.

Katama is one of three airports on the island. The main airport Martha's Vineyard Airport (MVY) is the only airport with commercial service, and handles the majority of the island's general aviation traffic as well. The third airport is the smaller Trade Wind Airport, a grass airfield in Oak Bluffs.

History
During World War II, Martha's Vineyard Airport functioned both as an outer defense and a training facility for gunnery and pilots. In addition to the main airport there was a small airfield at Katama near a gunnery practice area at the beach. Following World War II this airport was purchased by Steven Gentle, who ran the Katama Airpark until the 1980s when it was purchased with state conservation funds (as this airfield has five endangered plant or animal species).

Facilities
The airport is managed by the town of Edgartown. During the season (roughly May 31 to Labor Day), there are biplane and glider rides available, as well as flight instruction in four different aircraft.

There is a restaurant located adjacent to the airfield, currently named "Katama Kitchen." 

The Woods Hole Oceanographic Institute has a small data monitoring building adjacent to the hangar. It monitors wave action, beach erosion, and offshore wave action. It is not open to the public.

References

External links
 Katama Airfield web site
 
 AOPA airport information for 1B2
 Right Fork Diner web site

Airports in Dukes County, Massachusetts
Buildings and structures in Edgartown, Massachusetts